Patricia Molony (born  1930) is an Australian figure skater. She is the 1947 Australian national champion. At the 1947 World Figure Skating Championships, she became the first Australian lady to compete at the World Championships. She also competed at the European Figure Skating Championships before that event was restricted to European skaters only.

Family
Molony came from a skating family. Her father E.J. "Ted" Molony competed in ice dancing, and her younger sister Gweneth competed at the Olympics.

Competitive highlights

References

Sources
 
 

Australian female single skaters
Living people
Place of birth missing (living people)
1930 births